Little Rocky Hill is an unincorporated community located within South Brunswick Township in Middlesex County and Franklin Township, Somerset County, New Jersey, United States. The community is located atop a small hill east of the borough of Rocky Hill. The Middlesex–Somerset county line runs through the community along Old Road though elsewhere it follows Route 27. Carters Brook runs through the area flowing south.

References

South Brunswick, New Jersey
Franklin Township
Unincorporated communities in Middlesex County, New Jersey
Unincorporated communities in Somerset County, New Jersey
Unincorporated communities in New Jersey